Reginald "Reg" Stewart (30 October 1925 – 6 March 2011) was an English footballer who played as a centre half in The Football League.

Career
Born in Sheffield, Stewart played for Sheffield Wednesday and Colchester United in the Football League from 1946 until 1957, and with non-league clubs Hastings United and Clacton Town.
  
A member of the first ever Colchester United side to play in a Football League game, Reg was an uncompromising central defender who came south from Sheffield Wednesday.

A regular in the heart of the defence for seven years, he played some 268 times for the U's before leaving to sign for Clacton Town.

Honours

Club
Colchester United
 Southern League runner-up: 1949–50
 Southern League Cup winner: 1949–50

References

External links
 
 Reg Stewart at Colchester United Archive Database

1925 births
2011 deaths
Footballers from Sheffield
English footballers
Association football defenders
Colchester United F.C. players
Sheffield Wednesday F.C. players
Hastings United F.C. (1948) players
F.C. Clacton players
English Football League players